Wessell "Warmdaddy" Anderson (born 1966) is an American jazz alto and sopranino saxophonist.

Anderson grew up in Bedford-Stuyvesant and Crown Heights, and played jazz early on at the urging of his father, who was a drummer. He played in local clubs from his early teenage years, and studied at the Jazzmobile workshops with Frank Wess, Charles Davis, and Frank Foster. He also met Branford Marsalis, who convinced him to study with Alvin Batiste at Southern University in Louisiana.

Soon after this, Anderson began touring with the Wynton Marsalis Septet, and collaborated with Marsalis through the middle of the 1990s. He continued to play with Marsalis's Lincoln Center Jazz Orchestra beyond this. In 1994, he released his debut album on Atlantic Records; Eric Reed and Ben Wolfe were among those who played as sidemen. His 1998 album Live at the Village Vanguard featured Irvin Mayfield, Steve Kirby, Xavier Davis, and Jaz Sawyer.

Discography
 Warmdaddy in the Garden of Swing  (Atlantic, 1994)
 The Ways of Warmdaddy (Atlantic, 1996)
 Live at the Village Vanguard (Leaning House, 1998)
 Warm It Up, Warmdaddy! (Nu Jazz, 2009)

As sideman 
With Wynton Marsalis
 Big Train (Columbia/Sony Classical, 1999)
 ’’Live at the House of Tribes’’ (Blue Note, 2005)

With Marcus Roberts
"Deep in the Shed" 1990

References

 Alex Arcone, [ Wessell Anderson] at Allmusic

1966 births
Living people
American jazz saxophonists
American male saxophonists
Musicians from New York (state)
African-American jazz musicians
21st-century American saxophonists
21st-century American male musicians
American male jazz musicians
21st-century African-American musicians
20th-century African-American people